Cricket 07 is a 2006 cricket simulation computer game developed by EA Canada and HB Studios and published by EA Sports. It is available for Microsoft Windows and PlayStation 2. The game was released on 26 November 2006 in Europe and in Australia on 14 November 2006. The cover art for Cricket 07 features English cricketer Andrew Flintoff. This is the last cricket game published by EA Sports. This game has garnered massive popularity among the cricket playing nations and many patches have been produced to update the game.

Gameplay options 

Cricket 07 features a number of game types, including limited overs matches (50, 20, 10 or 5 overs), 4-day first-class matches and full-length test matches (5 days). You may select different pitches and different weather conditions in different venues. Several international venues are available, including the Eden Gardens in India and Lord's in England. The venues vary in conditions and pitch type, and these can be changed by the player.

The game gives players the option of entering different international and national contests, including full seasons and tournaments.

Expanded features of EA Sports Cricket 2007 include improved player control and easy stroke play, along with the introduction of the Ashes section. There was also an addition on commentary as Mark Nicholas joined Richie Benaud. The game gives players the option of entering different international and national contests, including full seasons and tournaments:

 World Championship: Control up to 16 international teams playing Limited Overs cricket for the World Cup trophy.
 World Series: Control three to five teams playing in a day/night tournament in venues around Australia.
 Knockout Cup: Control eight teams playing in a limited over tournament to win the trophy.
 Test Series: Choose two teams to contest a series of one to six Test matches.
 Tour: Select a team and engage in a series of Tour, One Day, and Test matches with the host nation's teams. The tours are
 Long Australia Tour
 Long England Tour
 Short Australia Tour
 Short England Tour
 Sub-Continent Tour
 Caribbean Tour
 South African Tour
 New Zealand and Zimbabwe Tour
 One-Day Circuit Tour

Australian State 
 State Season: The six state sides compete over an entire season.
 Pura Cup: Australia's four-day, two-innings tournament.
 One Day Domestic Series: Australia's 50-over One Day competition.
 KFC Twenty20 Big Bash: Australia's Twenty20 competition, where teams are divided into two pools of three.

English County 
 County Season: The 18 county teams play a full season of first-class cricket featuring all four competitions.
 Liverpool Victoria County Championship: England's four-day, two-innings, divisional tournament.
 NatWest Pro40: England's 40-over, One Day tournament between two divisions.
 C&G Trophy: A Limited Overs tournament with the winners of the North and South divisions playing for the trophy.
 Twenty20 Cup: England's Twenty20 competition.

The Ashes 
Players can compete for The Ashes between England and Australia. The following options are available:
 Ashes 2005 scenarios:  Players choose a team and play out scenarios from the 2005 Ashes series. On completing challenges, players are able to watch highlights videos in the Extras section.
 2005 npower Ashes series: Players choose either England or Australia and take them through all the warm up matches, ODIs and Test matches in the 2005 Ashes series. This is created as a balance in the form of an England-hosted tournament.
 2006-07 3 Mobile Ashes Series: Players choose either England or Australia and take them through all the warm up matches, ODIs and Test matches in the 2006-07 Ashes series. This is created as a balance in the form of an Australia-hosted tournament.

Licensing 
EA Sports lost the licensing for most of the teams for Cricket 07. Only Australia, England, South Africa and New Zealand licensed player names and kits. All other team names are generic; however, they can be edited in the Team Management option or with a roster. Also, Australian players are blended into World squads of 2005 ICC Super Series, but all the names are generic. The following national teams are available:
 Australia
 Bangladesh
 Bermuda
 Canada
 England
 India
 Ireland
 Kenya
 Namibia
 Netherlands
 New Zealand
 Pakistan
 Scotland
 South Africa
 Sri Lanka
 United States
 West Indies
 Zimbabwe

Reception

The PlayStation 2 version of Cricket 07 received "favorable" reviews, while the PC version received "unfavorable" reviews, according to the review aggregation website GameRankings.

References

External links
 

2006 video games
Cricket video games
EA Sports games
Electronic Arts games
HB Studios games
Multiplayer and single-player video games
PlayStation 2 games
Video games developed in Canada
Video games set in Australia
Video games set in Bangladesh
Video games set in Barbados
Video games set in India
Video games set in New Zealand
Video games set in Pakistan
Video games set in South Africa
Video games set in Sri Lanka
Video games set in the United Arab Emirates
Video games set in the United Kingdom
Video games set in Zimbabwe
Windows games